Bhagyada Balegara is a 2009 Kannada drama film directed by Om Sai Prakash and written by Ajay Kumar. The film features Shiva Rajkumar and Navya Nair  whilst Adi Lokesh, Anu Prabhakar and Sudharani play the supporting roles.

The film featured original score and soundtrack composed by Ilayaraja. The soundtrack included two of the most popular folk songs in Kannada.

Cast 

 Shiva Rajkumar as Chennaiah
 Navya Nair as Cheluvi
 Anu Prabhakar 
 Sudharani
 Sudha Belawadi
 Adi Lokesh
 Shobha Raghavendra
 Doddanna
 Sadhu Kokila
 Padma Vasanthi
 Ramesh Bhat
 Sathyajith

Reception

Critical response 

R G Vijayasarathy of Rediff.com scored the film at 2 out of 5 stars and says "Technically the film is average and that includes the camera work by M R Seenu. Bhagyadha Balegaara can be watched only for the splendid performances of Shivaraj Kumar and Navya Nair, and Ilayaraja's well picturised three songs". A critic from Deccan Herald wrote "Saiprakash chose not to make use of these things,  thereby rendering the film a little weak. Coming back to the film, Seenu’s camera seems to have caught the flu bug, leaving an unsatisfactory finish or perhaps it is a manifestation of lack of funds". A critic from The Times of India wrote "Apart from a lively performance from Shivrajkumar, Navya Nair excels. Shobha Raghavendra is brilliant. M R Seenus camerawork is okay. Ilayarajas good music score and Malavalli Saikrishna''s catchy dialogues are the other highlights".

Soundtrack 
The music was composed by Ilayaraja including the title song inspired from the popular folk song. The audio was received with positive reviews.

References

External links 

 Review at Oneindia.com

2009 films
2000s Kannada-language films
Indian drama films
Films scored by Ilaiyaraaja
Films directed by Sai Prakash